Selenographia, sive Lunae descriptio (Selenography, or A Description of The Moon) was printed in 1647 and is a milestone work by Johannes Hevelius. It includes the first detailed map of the Moon, created from Hevelius's personal observations. In his treatise, Hevelius reflected on the difference between his own work and that of Galileo Galilei. Hevelius remarked that the quality of Galileo's representations of the Moon in Sidereus nuncius (1610) left something to be desired. Selenography was dedicated to King Ladislaus IV of Poland and along with Riccioli/Grimaldi's Almagestum Novum became the standard work on the Moon for over a century. There are many copies that have survived, including those in Bibliothèque nationale de France, in the library of Polish Academy of Sciences, in the Stillman Drake Collection at the Thomas Fisher Rare Books Library at the University of Toronto, and in the Gunnerus Library at the Norwegian University of Science and Technology in Trondheim.

Notes

External links
Selenographia, sive Lunae descriptio

1647 books
Lunar science
Astronomy books